Nova Vas is the largest village and the administrative centre of the Municipality of Bloke in the Inner Carniola region of Slovenia.

Name
Nova Vas was attested in written sources as villa nova in 1282, Newndorf in 1341, and Newdarff in 1499, among other spellings. The name Nova vas literally means 'new village', designating a settlement that was created later than nearby villages. Nova vas is a common toponym in Slovenia.

References

External links

Nova Vas on Geopedia

Populated places in the Municipality of Bloke